Barlings and Low Barlings are two small hamlets lying south off the A158 road at Langworth, in the West Lindsey district of Lincolnshire, England. Low Barlings is a scattered collection of homes, situated along a trackway south from Barlings towards boggy ground near the River Witham. Both hamlets are in the civil parish of Barlings. The population of the civil parish at the 2011 census was 460.

History
Barlings is listed in the Domesday book as "Berlinge".

Barlings includes the Grade II listed church of St Edward the Confessor, and Grade I listed Barlings Abbey ruins. Other listed buildings include a hall, house and farm house. Part of the parish was once a medieval deer park.

There are no standing remains of Barlings Abbey but the main building outside the monastic church has been interpreted as a detached monastic household such as the abbot's lodging. This building was reformed as a post-dissolution secular residence of Charles Brandon, Duke of Suffolk, who used it as a vice-regal palace. Brandon was King Henry VIII's vice-regent in Lincolnshire in the wake of the Lincolnshire Rising.

References

External links
 
 Aerial view of Barlings

Villages in Lincolnshire
Civil parishes in Lincolnshire
West Lindsey District